Condor, Autumn Wind is a live album by American jazz trumpeter Wadada Leo Smith recorded with Harumi Makino Smith. The album is dedicated to Sarhanna, Kashala and Lamar, in special memory of Dizzy Gillespie.

Critical reception
Bill Shoemaker of JazzTimes noted "Condor, Autumn Wind, recorded live in Durham, shows the potential of the emerging Mid-Atlantic concert circuit for avant garde jazz and improvised music. A lot of improvisers talk vaguely about creating a space in which the music can be spawned and received, but Wadada Leo Smith pursues and achieves this goal with a unique, focused discipline on the mostly solo Condor, Autumn Wind. Throughout the program, Smith’s trumpet solos have an episodic quality, where the overall shape of the piece is altered with each boldly shaped phrase. At strategic points in the program, he complements his palette with voice, mbira, percussion, wood flute, and bike horn-like seal-horn. On three pieces, Harumi Makino Smith’s poetry (read both in English and Japanese) provides an evocative counterpoint. In all, Condor, Autumn Wind is a winding journey with many intriguing stops."

Track listing

Personnel
Band
Wadada Leo Smith – cover art, flugelhorn, flute, horn, maracas mbira, producer, siren, trumpet, vocals, voices
Harumi Makino Smith – cover art, performer, poetry 

Production
Mirla del Rosario – artwork, layout design
Robert Frenz – photography
Mac McCaughan – design, executive producer
Dan McCleary – layout design
Brian Paulson – engineer
Kashala Smith – illustrations
Chris Stamey – mastering

References

Wadada Leo Smith live albums
1998 live albums